The 1993 Volvo Tennis/Los Angeles was a men's tennis tournament held on outdoor hardcourts at the Los Angeles Tennis Center in Los Angeles, California in the United States that was part of the World Series category of the 1993 ATP Tour. It was the 67th edition of the tournament and was held from August 2, 1993, through August 8, 1993. Fourth-seeded Richard Krajicek won his second consecutive singles title at the event and earned $39,600 first-prize money.

Finals

Singles

 Richard Krajicek defeated  Michael Chang 0–6, 7–6(7–3), 7–6(7–5)
 It was Krajicek's 1st and only singles title of the year and the 4th of his career.

Doubles

 Wayne Ferreira /  Michael Stich defeated  Grant Connell /  Scott Davis 7–6, 7–6

See also
 1993 Virginia Slims of Los Angeles – women's tournament

References

External links
 ITF tournament edition details

Los Angeles Open
Los Angeles Open (tennis)
Los Angeles Open
Los Angeles Open
Los Angeles Open